Victoria Louise or Viktoria Luise may refer to:

 , a German cruise ship launched in 1897, that ran aground off the coast of Jamaica in 1906
 , a German passenger liner originally named SS Deutschland; renamed in 1910
 LZ 11 Viktoria Luise, a pre-World War I German airship (see Deutsche Luftschiffahrts-AG#Airships)
 Princess Viktoria Luise of Prussia